Akateko may refer to:
 Akateko people, an ethnic group of Guatemala
 Akateko language, a Mayan language
 Akateko (folklore), a monster in Japanese folklore